There are several passages in the Talmud which are believed by some scholars to be references to Jesus. The name used in the Talmud is "Yeshu", the Aramaic vocalization (although not spelling) of the Hebrew name Yeshua.

The identification of Jesus with any number of individuals named Yeshu has numerous problems, as most of the individuals are said to have lived in time periods far detached from that of Jesus; Yeshu the sorcerer is noted for being executed by the Hasmonean government which lost legal authority in 63 BC, Yeshu the student is described being among the Pharisees who returned to Israel from Egypt in 74 BC, and Yeshu ben Pandera/ben Stada's stepfather is noted as speaking with Rabbi Akiva shortly before the rabbi's execution, an event which occurred in c. 134 AD. These events would place the lifetime of any Yeshu decades before or after the birth and death of Jesus.

The first Christian censorship of the Talmud happened in the year 521. However, far better documented censorship began during the disputations of the Middle Ages. Catholic authorities under Pope Gregory IX accused the Talmud of containing blasphemous references to Jesus and his mother, Mary. Jews responded to the disputations by saying there were no references to Jesus in the Talmud. They asserted that Joshua was a common Jewish name, along with its derivations, and that the citations referred to individuals other than Jesus. The disputations led to many of the references being removed (censored) from subsequent editions of the Talmud.

In the modern era, there has been a variance of views among scholars of the possible references to Jesus in the Talmud, depending partly on presuppositions as to the extent to which the ancient rabbis were preoccupied with Jesus and Christianity. This range of views among modern scholars on the subject has been described as a range from "minimalists" who see few passages with reference to Jesus, to "maximalists" who see many passages having reference to Jesus. These terms "minimalist" and "maximalist" are not unique to discussion of the Talmud text; they are also used in discussion of academic debate on other aspects of Jewish vs. Christian and Christian vs. Jewish contact and polemic in the early centuries of Christianity, such as the Adversus Iudaeos genre. "Minimalists" include Jacob Z. Lauterbach (1951) ("who recognize[d] only relatively few passages that actually have Jesus in mind"), while "maximalists" include Herford (1903) (who concluded that most of the references related to Jesus, but were non-historical oral traditions which circulated among Jews), and Schäfer (2007) (who concluded that the passages were parodies of parallel stories about Jesus in the New Testament incorporated into the Talmud in the 3rd and 4th centuries that illustrate the inter-sect rivalry between Judaism and nascent Christianity).

Some editions of the Talmud are missing some of the references, which were removed either by Christian censors starting in the 13th century, or by Jews themselves due to fear of reprisals, or some were possibly lost by negligence or accident. However, most modern editions published since the early 20th century have restored most of the references.

History

During the Middle Ages a series of debates on Judaism were staged by the Catholic Church – including the Disputation of Paris, the Disputation of Barcelona, and Disputation of Tortosa – and during those disputations, Jewish converts to Christianity, such as Pablo Christiani and Nicholas Donin claimed the Talmud contained insulting references to Jesus. An early work describing Jesus in the Talmud was Pugio Fidei ("Dagger of Faith") (c. 1280) by the Catalan Dominican Ramón Martí, a Jewish convert to Christianity. In 1681 Johann Christoph Wagenseil translated and published a collection of anti-Christian polemics from Jewish sources, with the title Tela Ignea Satanæ, sive Arcani et Horribiles Judæorum Adversus Christum, Deum, et Christianam Religionem Libri (Flaming Arrows of Satan, that is, the secret and horrible books of the Jews against Christ, God, and the Christian religion) which discussed Jesus in the Talmud. The first book devoted solely to the topic of Jesus in the Talmud was the Latin work Jesus in Talmude published in 1699 by Rudolf Martin Meelführer, a student of Wagenseil at Altdorf. In 1700, Johann Andreas Eisenmenger published Entdecktes Judenthum (Judaism Unmasked), which included descriptions of Jesus in the Talmud, and which would become the basis of much anti-Semitic literature in later centuries such as The Talmud Unmasked written in 1892 by Justinas Bonaventure Pranaitis.

Starting in the 20th century the topic of Jesus in Judaic literature became subject to more unbiased, scholarly research, such as Das Leben Jesu nach jüdischen Quellen (The Life of Jesus From Jewish Sources) written in 1902 by Samuel Krauss, which was the first scholarly analysis of the Judaic anti-Christian polemic Toledot Yeshu (The Biography of Jesus). In 1903, Unitarian scholar R. Travers Herford wrote Christianity in Talmud and Midrash, which became the standard work on the topic in the Christian world, and he concluded that a large number of references referred to Jesus, not as a historical individual, but instead as the messiah of Christianity. In 1910, Hermann Strack wrote Jesus, die Häretiker und die Christen nach den ältesten jüdischen Angaben (Jesus, the heretics and the Christians according to the oldest Jewish data), which found no evidence of a historical Jesus in the Talmud. In 1922 Joseph Klausner wrote Yeshu ha-Notzri (Jesus of Nazareth) which concluded that "the evidence [for a historical Jesus] in the Talmud is scanty and does not contribute much to our knowledge of the historical Jesus; much of it is legendary and reflects the Jewish attempt to counter Christian claims and reproaches" but he did conclude some material was historically reliable. In 1950 Morris Goldstein wrote Jesus in the Jewish Tradition, including sections on the Toledoth Yeshu. In 1951, Jacob Z. Lauterbach wrote the essay Jesus in the Talmud. In 1978 Johann Maier wrote Jesus von Nazareth in der talmudischen Überlieferung (Jesus of Nazareth in the Talmudic tradition) in which he concludes that there is virtually no evidence of the historical Jesus in the Talmud, and that the references to Jesus were "legendary" and probably added late in the Talmudic era "as a reaction to Christian provocations". In 2007, Peter Schäfer wrote Jesus in the Talmud in which he tried to find a middle ground between "anti-Jewish Christian" and "apologetic Jewish" interpretations. He concluded that the references to Jesus (as the messiah of Christianity) were included in the early (3rd and 4th century) versions of the Talmud, and that they were parodies of New Testament narratives.

In the context of Christian-Judaic polemics
In the first few centuries CE, there were many sects of Judaism (such as Pharisees, Essenes, and Sadducees) each claiming to be the correct faith. Some scholars treat Christianity, during that era, referred to as Early Christianity, as simply one of many sects of Judaism. Some sects wrote polemics advocating their position, and occasionally disparaging rival sects. Some scholars view the depictions of Jesus in the Talmud as a manifestation of those inter-sect rivalries – thus the depictions can be read as polemics by the rabbinic authors of the Talmud which indirectly criticized the rival sect (Christianity), which was growing and becoming more dominant.

Relationship to New Testament
Peter Schäfer concluded that the references were not from the early tannaitic period (1st and 2nd centuries) but rather from the 3rd and 4th centuries, during the amoraic period. He asserts that the references in the Babylonian Talmud were "polemical counter-narratives that parody the New Testament stories, most notably the story of Jesus' birth and death" and that the rabbinical authors were familiar with the Gospels (particularly the Gospel of John) in their form as the Diatessaron and the Peshitta, the New Testament of the Syrian Church. Schäfer argues that the message conveyed in the Talmud was a "bold and self-confident" assertion of correctness of Judaism, maintaining that "there is no reason to feel ashamed because we rightfully executed a blasphemer and idolater."

By way of comparison the New Testament itself also documents conflict with rabbinical Judaism, for example in the John 8:41 charge "We are not born of fornication." and "Are we not right in saying that you are a Samaritan and have a demon?" and in return in the description in Revelation of a "synagogue of Satan."

Early anti-Christian sentiments
In contrast to Peter Schäfer, Daniel J. Lasker suggests that the Talmudic stories about Jesus are not deliberate, provocative polemics, but instead demonstrate "embryonic" Jewish objections to Christianity which would later "blossom into a full-scale Jewish polemical attack on Christianity [the Toledoth Yeshu]".

Ambivalent relationship
Jeffrey Rubenstein has argued that the accounts in Chullin and Avodah Zarah ("Idolatry") reveal an ambivalent relationship between rabbis and Christianity. In his view the tosefta account reveals that at least some Jews believed Christians were true healers, but that the rabbis saw this belief as a major threat. Concerning the Babylonian Talmud account in Avoda Zarah, Boyarin views Jacob of Sechania as a Christian preacher and understands Rabbi Eliezer's arrest for minuth ("heresy") as an arrest by the Romans for practising Christianity. When the Governor (the text uses the word for chief judge) interrogated him, the rabbi answered that he "trusted the judge." Boyarin has suggested that this was the Jewish version of the Br'er Rabbit approach to domination, which he contrasts to the strategy of many early Christians, who proclaim their beliefs in spite of the consequences (i.e. martyrdom). Although Rabbi Eliezer was referring to God, the Governor interpreted him to be referring to the Governor himself, and freed the rabbi. According to them the account also reveals that there was greater contact between Christians and Jews in the 2nd century than commonly believed. They view the account of the teaching of Yeshu as an attempt to mock Christianity. According to Rubenstein, the structure of this teaching, in which a biblical prooftext is used to answer a question about biblical law, is common to both the rabbis and early Christians. The vulgar content, however, may have been used to parody Christian values. Boyarin considers the text to be an acknowledgment that rabbis often interacted with Christians, despite their doctrinal antipathy.

Disputations and censorship

Between 1239 and 1775 the Catholic Church at various times either forced the censoring of parts of the Talmud that were theologically problematic or the destruction of copies of the Talmud.

During the Middle Ages a series of debates on Judaism were held by Catholic authorities – including the Disputation of Paris (1240), the Disputation of Barcelona (1263), and Disputation of Tortosa (1413–14) – and during those disputations, Jewish converts to Christianity, such as Nicholas Donin (in Paris) and Pablo Christiani (in Barcelona) claimed the Talmud contained insulting references to Jesus.

During these disputations the representatives of the Jewish communities offered various defences to the charges of the Christian disputants. Notably influential on later Jewish responses was the defence of Yechiel of Paris (1240) that a passage about an individual named Yeshu in the Talmud was not a reference to the Christian Jesus, though at the same time Yechiel also conceded that another reference to Yeshu was. This has been described as the "theory of two Jesuses" though Berger (1998) notes that Yechiel in fact argues for three Jesuses. This defence featured again in later Jewish defences during the medieval period, such as that of Nachmanides at the Disputation of Barcelona, though others such as Profiat Duran at the Disputation of Tortosa did not follow this argument.

Amy-Jill Levine notes that even today some rabbinical experts do not consider that the Talmud's account of Jesus' death is a reference to the Jesus of the New Testament. Gustaf Dalman (1922), Joachim Jeremias (1960), Mark Allen Powell (1998) and Roger T. Beckwith (2005) were also favourable to the view the Yeshu references in the Talmud were not to Jesus. Richard Bauckham considers Yeshu a legitimate, if rare, form of the name in use at the time, and writes that an ossuary bearing both the names Yeshu and Yeshua ben Yosef shows that it "was not invented by the rabbis as a way of avoiding pronouncing the real name of Jesus of Nazareth"

Numerous times between 1239 and 1775 all copies of the Talmud were destroyed. In 1280 following the Disputation of Barcelona the Talmud was censored. Following the invention of the printing press, the Talmud was banned by the Pope. All printed editions of the Talmud, including the Basel Talmud and the Vilna Edition Shas, were censored. In 1559 the Talmud was placed on the Roman Index and banned. In 1564 under the Tridentine Index an expunged version of the Talmud was allowed. In 1592 the pope ordered all copies of the Talmud and other heretical writing destroyed expunged or not. The total prohibition would stay in place until 1775. Even then the censorship system would remain in force. As a result of these disputations many manuscript editions had references to Jesus removed or changed, and subsequent manuscripts sometimes omitted the passages entirely. Few copies would survive.

In the 20th century, new editions began restoring the censored material, such as in the 1935 English Soncino edition.

Text-criticism, versions, and alterations
Starting in the 13th century, manuscripts of the Talmud were sometimes altered in response to the criticisms made during the disputations, and in response to orders from the Christian church. Existing manuscripts were sometimes altered (for example, by erasure) and new manuscripts often omitted the passages entirely. Peter Schäfer compared several editions and documented some alterations as illustrated in the following table:

{| class="wikitable" style="width:99%" border="2"

!width=14%|Edition / Manuscript
!width=25%|Passage on execution (Sanhedrin 43 a–b)
!width=25%|Passage on punishment in afterlife (b Gittin 57a)
!width=25%|Passage on disciples (Sanhedrin 43 a–b)
|-
|  Herzog 1
|| on the eve of Passover they hanged Jesus the Nazarene
||
||  Jesus the Nazarene had five disciples
|-
|  Vatican 130
||
||  he went and brought up Jesus the Nazarene
|
|-
|  Vatican 140
||
||  he went and brought up Jesus
|
|-
|  Munich 95
|| on the eve of Passover they hanged [name erased]
||   he went and brought up Jesus
| [text erased]
|-
|  Firenze II.1.8–9
|| on Sabbath even and  the eve of Passover they hanged Jesus the Nazarene
||
||  Jesus the Nazarene had five disciples
|-
|  Karlsruhe 2
|| on the eve of Passover they hanged Jesus the Nazarene
||
||   Jesus the Nazarene had five disciples
|-
|  Barco
|| on the eve of Passover they hanged [not legible]
||
||   [not legible] had five disciples
|-
|  Soncino
|| on the eve of Passover they hanged [not legible]
||  he went and brought up [name missing]
||
|-
|  Vilna
|| [whole passage deleted by censor]
||  he went and brought up the sinners of Israel
||   [whole passage deleted by censor]
|}

As evidence of the historical Jesus
Bart Ehrman, and separately Mark Allan Powell, state that the Talmud references are quite late (hundreds of years) and give no historically reliable information about the teachings or actions of Jesus during his life. Ehrman clarifies that the name "Son of Panthera" (Roman who allegedly was the seducer of Mary) was a tradition, as scholars have long recognized, that represented an attack on the Christian view, that he was the son of a virgin. In Greek, the term for virgin is parthenos, which is similar to panthera, implying that "son of panthera" is a pun on "son of a virgin". The name "ben Stada", used for the same figure, is explained by Peter Schäfer as a reference to his mother's supposed adultery:

Peter Schäfer states that there can be no doubt that the narrative of the execution of Jesus in the Talmud refers to Jesus of Nazareth, but states that the rabbinic literature in question are from a later Amoraic period and may have drawn on the Christian gospels, and may have been written as responses to them.

Scholars debate whether the Talmud provides any evidence of Jesus as a historical individual. Van Voorst (2000) describes this as a spectrum of opinion:
 On one side stand Johann Maier (1978) and those broadly sympathetic to his conclusions such as John P. Meier and Jacob Neusner. Maier discounts accounts with no mention of the name Jesus, and further discounts those that do mention Jesus by name, such as Sanh. 43a and 107b, as later medieval changes. Arguments against the current form of Talmudic references to Jesus being evidence of a historical individual include contextual evidence, such as chronological inconsistencies, for example the original contexts of accounts in the Tosefta and Talmud take place in different historical periods. Maier also views that the tradition first seen in the writings of Celsus can not be regarded as a reliable reference to the historical Jesus.
 On the other side stand scholars such as Joseph Klausner (1925), following R. Travers Herford (1901) and Bernhard Pick (1887), who believed that the Talmud gives some insight into Jesus as a historical individual. Some of these researchers  contend that the Talmud's importance and credibility as an early source lies in the fact that it gives the "opposition view" to Jesus, and they have used the Talmud to draw the conclusions about the historical Jesus, such as:
Robert E. Van Voorst, Jesus Outside the New Testament: An Introduction to the Ancient Evidence, Wm. B. Eerdmans Publishing, 2000. pp 111–120
Norman Perrin, The New Testament, An Introduction: Proclamation and Parenesis, Myth and History, Harcourt Brace Jovanovich, 1982. pp 407–408
R. Travers Herford, Christianity in Talmud and Midrash, KTAV Publishing House Inc, 2007. pp 35–96
C. H. Dodd, Historical Tradition in the Fourth Gospel, Cambridge University Press, 1976. pp 303–305

Possible Talmudic references
There are several Talmudic passages that are said to be referring to Jesus. The following are among those considered the most controversial, contested, and possibly the most notable.

There are still noticeable challenges to the identification of Yeshu as Jesus, as elsewhere in the Talmud his stepfather, Pappos ben Yehuda, is mentioned as being martyred with Rabbi Akiva and is himself mentioned as being among the Pharisees returning to Israel following their persecution by John Hyrcanus, which would place Yeshu's lifetime anywhere between 130 after and 70 years before the birth of Jesus.

Specific references
Sanhedrin 43a relates the trial and execution of a sorcerer named Jesus (Yeshu in Hebrew) and his five disciples. The sorcerer is stoned and hanged on the Eve of Passover.

Sanhedrin 107 tells of a Jesus ("Yeshu") who "offended his teacher by paying too much attention to the inn-keeper's wife. Jesus wished to be forgiven, but [his rabbi] was too slow to forgive him, and Jesus in despair went away and put up a brick [idol] and worshipped it."

In Gittin 56b and 57a, a story is told in which Onkelos summons up the spirit of a Yeshu who sought to harm Israel. He describes his punishment in the afterlife as boiling in excrement.

Some scholars claim that the Hebrew name Yeshu is not a short form of the name Yeshua, but rather an acrostic for the Hebrew phrase "may his name and memory be blotted out" created by taking the first letter of the Hebrew words.

In addition, at the 1240 Disputation of Paris, Donin presented the allegation that the Talmud was blasphemous towards Mary, the mother of Jesus (Miriam in Hebrew), and this criticism has been repeated by many Christian sources. The texts cited by critics include Sanhedrin 67a, Sanhedrin 106a, and Shabbath 104b. However, the references to Mary are not specific, and some assert that they do not refer to Jesus' mother, or perhaps refer to Mary Magdalen.

Summary
Scholars have identified the following references in the Talmud that some conclude refer to Jesus:
 Jesus as a sorcerer with disciples (b Sanh 43a–b)
 Healing in the name of Jesus (Hul 2:22f; AZ 2:22/12; y Shab 124:4/13; QohR 1:8; b AZ 27b)
 As a Torah teacher (b AZ 17a; Hul 2:24; QohR 1:8)
 As a son or disciple that turned out badly (Sanh 103a/b; Ber 17b)
 As a frivolous disciple who practiced magic and turned to idolatry (Sanh 107b; Sot 47a)
 Jesus' punishment in afterlife (b Git 56b, 57a)
 Jesus' execution (b Sanh 43a-b)
 Jesus as the son of Mary (Shab 104b, Sanh 67a)

As a sorcerer with disciples
Sanhedrin 43a relates the trial and execution of Jesus and his five disciples. Here, Jesus is a sorcerer who has enticed other Jews to apostasy. A herald is sent to call for witnesses in his favour for forty days before his execution. No one comes forth and in the end he is stoned and hanged on the Eve of Passover. His five disciples, named Matai, Nekai, Netzer, Buni, and Todah are then tried. Word play is made on each of their names, and they are executed. It is mentioned that leniency could not be applied because of Jesus' influence with the royal government (malkhut).

The full passage is:

Healing in the name of Jesus
Scholars have identified passages in the Talmud and associated Talmudic texts that involve invoking Jesus' name, as the messiah of Christianity, in order to perform magical healing:

Tosefta Hullin 2:22f – "Jacob ... came to heal him in the name of Jesus son of Pantera" - this section exists in variant spellings of Jesus: mi-shem Yeshu ben Pantera (principal edition), mi-shem Yeshu ben Pandera (London MS), mi-shem Yeshua ben Pantera (Vienna MS)*Jerusalem Abodah Zarah 2:2/12 – "Jacob ... came to heal him.  He said to him:  we will speak to you in the name of Jesus son of Pandera" (Editions or MS: Venice)
Jerusalem Shabboth 14:4/13 – "Jacob ... came in the name of Jesus Pandera to heal him" (Editions or MS: Venice)
Qohelet Rabbah 1:8(3) – "Jacob ... came to heal him in the name of Jesus son of Pandera" (Editions or MSs: Vatican 291, Oxford 164, Pesaro 1519)
Babylonian Abodah Zarah 27b – "Jacob ... came to heal him" (Editions or MSs: New York 15, Pearo, Vilna)
Jerusalem Abodah Zarah 2:2/7 – "someone ... whispered to him in the name of Jesus son of Pandera" (Editions or MS:  Venice)
Jerusalem Shabboth 14:4/8 – "someone ... whispered to him in the name of Jesus son of Pandera" (Editions or MS: Venice)

The full passage in the Talmud Bavli is:

Whereas in the Talmud Yerushalmi, the passage is the following:

Torah teacher
Scholars have identified passages that mention Jesus, as the messiah of Christianity, in the context of a Torah teacher:

Babylonian Abodah Zarah 17a – "One of the disciples of Jesus the Nazarene found me" (Editions or MSs: Munich 95, Paris 1377, New York 15)
Babylonian Abodah Zarah 17a – "Thus I was taught by Jesus the Nazarene" (Editions or MSs: Munich 95, Paris 1337)
Tosefta Hullin 2:24 – "He told me of a word of heresy in the name of Jesus son of Pantiri"
Qohelet Rabbah 1:8(3) – "He told me a word in the name of Jesus son of Pandera" (Editions or MSs: Oxford 164, Vatican 291, Pesaro 1519)

The full passage is:

The son or disciple who turned out badly
Sanhedrin 103a and Berachot 17b talk about a Yeshu ha-Nosri (Jesus of Nazareth) who "burns his food in public", possibly a reference to pagan sacrifices or a metaphor for apostasy. The account is discussing Manasseh the king of Judah infamous for having turned to idolatry and having persecuted the Jews (2 Kings 21). It is part of a larger discussion about three kings and four commoners excluded from paradise. These are also discussed in the Shulkhan Arukh where the son who burns his food is explicitly stated to be Manasseh.  The passages identified by scholars in this context are:

Babylonian Sanhedrin 103a – "that you will not have a son or disciple ... like Jesus the Nazarene" (Editions or MSs: Firenze II.1.8–9, Barco, Munich 95)
Babylonian Berakoth 17b – "that we will not have a son or disciple ... like Jesus the Nazarene" (Editions or MS: Oxford 23)

The full passages are:

As a sinful student who practiced magic and turned to idolatry
Passages in Sanhedrin 107b and Sotah 47a refer to an individual (Yeshu) that some scholars conclude is a reference to Jesus, regarded as the messiah of Christianity.  In these passages, Jesus is described as a student of Joshua ben Perachiah (second half of the 2nd century BCE), and he (Jesus) was sent away for misinterpreting a word that in context should have been understood as referring to the Inn; he instead understood it to mean the innkeeper's wife (the same word can mean "inn" and "hostess").  His teacher said "Here is a nice inn", to which he replied "Her eyes are crooked", to which his teacher responded "Evil one! Is this what you are occupied in?" (Gazing at women was considered sinful.) After several returns for forgiveness he mistook Perachiah's signal to wait a moment as a signal of final rejection, and so he turned to idolatry.   Some passages that have been identified by scholars as mentioning Jesus, as the messiah of Christianity, in this context include:

Babylonian Sanhedrin 107b – "not as Yehoshua b. Perahya who pushed Jesus the Nazarene away" (Editions or MSs: Barco, Vilna)
Babylonian Sotah 47a – "not as Yehoshua b. Perahya who pushed Jesus the Nazarene away" (Editions or MSs: Vatican 110, Vilna, Munich 95)
Babylonian Sanhedrin 107b – "Jesus said to him: Rabbi, her eyes are narrow" (Editions or MSs: Herzog 1)
Babylonian Sotah 47a – "Jesus the Nazarene said to him: Rabbi, her eyes are narrow" (Editions or MS: Oxford 20)
Babylonian Sanhedrin 107b – "The master said: Jesus the Nazarene practiced magic (Editions or MSs: Firenze II.1.8–9, Barco )
Babylonian Sotah 47a – "The master said: Jesus the Nazarene because he practiced magic" (Editions or MS: Munich 95)

The full passage is:

The story ends by invoking a Mishnaic era teaching that Yeshu practised black magic, deceived and led Israel astray. This quote is seen by some as an explanation in general for the designation Yeshu.

According to Dr. Rubenstein, the account in Sanhedrin 107b recognizes the kinship between Christians and Jews, since Jesus is presented as a disciple of a prominent Rabbi. But it also reflects and speaks to an anxiety fundamental to Rabbinic Judaism. Prior to the destruction of the Temple in 70, Jews were divided into different sects, each promoting different interpretations of the law. Rabbinic Judaism domesticated and internalized conflicts over the law, while vigorously condemning any sectarianism. In other words, rabbis are encouraged to disagree and argue with one another, but these activities must be carefully contained, or else they could lead to a schism. Although this story may not present a historically accurate account of Jesus' life, it does use a fiction about Jesus to communicate an important truth about the Rabbis. Moreover, Rubenstein sees this story as a rebuke to overly harsh Rabbis. Boyarin suggests that the Rabbis were well aware of Christian views of the Pharisees and that this story acknowledges the Christian belief that Jesus was forgiving and the Pharisees were not (see Mark 2:1–2), while emphasizing forgiveness as a necessary Rabbinic value.

Punishment in the afterlife
In Gittin 56b–57a a story is recorded in which Onkelos, a nephew of the Roman emperor Titus who destroyed the Second Temple, intent on converting to Judaism, summons up the spirits of Yeshu and others to help make up his mind. Each describes his punishment in the afterlife.

The complete passage from the 1935 Soncino edition is:

Execution
Scholars have identified passages that mention Jesus in the context of his execution:

Babylonian Sanhedrin 43a–b – "on the eve of Passover they hanged Jesus the Nazarene" (Editions or MSs: Herzog 1, Karlsruhe 2)
Babylonian Sanhedrin 43a–b – "Jesus the Nazarene is going forth to be stoned" (Editions or MSs: Herzog 1, Firenze II.1.8–9, Karlsruhe 2)
Babylonian Sanhedrin 43a–b – "Do you suppose Jesus the Nazarene was one for whom a defense could be made?" (Editions or MSs: Herzog 1, Firenze II.1.8–9, Karlsruhe 2)
Babylonian Sanhedrin 43a–b – "With Jesus the Nazarene it was different" (Editions or MSs: Herzog 1, Firenze II.1.8–9, Karlsruhe 2)

The full passage is:

In the Florence manuscript of the Talmud (1177 CE) an addition is made to Sanhedrin 43a saying that Yeshu was hanged on the eve of the Sabbath.

Mother and father

Some Talmudic sources include passages which identify a "son of Pandera" (ben Pandera in Hebrew), and some scholars conclude that these are references to the messiah of Christianity. Medieval Hebrew midrashic literature contain the "Episode of Jesus" (known also as Maaseh Yeshu), in which Jesus is described as being the son of Joseph, the son of Pandera  (see: Episode of Jesus). The account portrays Jesus as an impostor.

The Talmud, and other talmudic texts, contain several references to the "son of Pandera".  A few of the references explicitly name Jesus ("Yeshu") as the "son of Pandera": these explicit connections are found in the Tosefta, the Qohelet Rabbah, and the Jerusalem Talmud, but not in the Babylonian Talmud. The explicit connections found in the Jerusalem Talmud are debated because the name "Jesus" ("Yeshu") is found only in a marginal gloss in some manuscripts, but other scholars conclude that it was in the original versions of the Jerusalem Talmud.

The texts include several spellings for the father's name (Pandera, Panthera, Pandira, Pantiri, or Pantera) and some scholars conclude that these are all references to the same individual, but other scholars suggest that they may be unrelated references. In some of the texts, the father produced a son with a woman named Mary. Several of the texts indicate that the mother was not married to Pandera, and was committing adultery and – by implication – Jesus was a bastard child. Some of the texts indicate that Mary's husband's name was Stada.

Some Talmudic sources include passages which identify a "son of Stada"  or "son of Stara" (ben Stada or ben Stara in Hebrew), and some scholars conclude that these are references to the messiah of Christianity.

Son of Pantera / Pandera in a healing context
Two talmudic-era texts that explicitly associate Jesus as the son of Pantera/Pandera are:

Tosefta Hullin 2:22f "Jacob ... came to heal him in the name of Jesus son of Pantera"
Qohelet Rabbah 1:8(3) "Jacob ... came to heal him in the name of Jesus son of Pandera"

Both of the above passages describe situations where Jesus' name is invoked to perform magical healing.  In addition, some editions of the Jerusalem Talmud explicitly identify Jesus as the son of Pandera:

Jerusalem Abodah Zarah 2:2/7 "someone ... whispered to him in the name of Jesus son of Pandera"
Jerusalem Shabboth 14:4/8 "someone ... whispered to him in the name of Jesus son of Pandera"
Jerusalem Abodah Zarah 2:2/12 "Jacob ... came to heal him. He said to him: we will speak to you in the name of Jesus son of Pandera"
Jerusalem Shabboth 14:4/13 "Jacob ... came in the name of Jesus Pandera to heal him"

However, some editions of the Jerusalem Talmud do not contain the name Jesus in these passages, so the association in this case is disputed.  The  parallel passages in the Babylonian Talmud do not contain the name Jesus.

Son of Pantiri / Pandera in a teaching context
Other Talmudic narratives describe Jesus as the son of a Pantiri or Pandera, in a teaching context:
Tosefta Hullin 2:24 "He told me of a word of heresy in the name of Jesus son of Pantiri"
Qohelet Rabbah 1:8(3) "He told me a word in the name of Jesus son of Pandera"

However, the parallel accounts in the Babylonian Talmud mention Jesus but do not mention the father's name:
Babylonian Abodah Zarah 17a "One of the disciples of Jesus the Nazarene found me"
Babylonian Abodah Zarah 17a "Thus I was taught by Jesus the Nazarene"

Pandera and alleged adultery by Mary
The Babylonian talmud contains narratives that discuss an anonymous person who brought witchcraft out of Egypt, and the person is identified as "son of Pandera" or "son of Stada".  The Talmud discusses whether the individual (the name Jesus is not present in these passages) is the son of Stada, or Pandera, and a suggestion is made that the mother Mary committed adultery.

Babylonian Shabbat 104b "Was he the son of Stara (and not) the son of Pandera?" (Editions or MSs: Oxford 23, Soncino)
Babylonian Sanhedrin 67a "Was he the son of Stara (and not) the son of Pandera?" (Editions or MSs: Herzog 1, Karlsruhe 2, ...)
Babylonian Shabbat 104b "husband Stada, lover Pandera" (Editions or MSs: Vatican 108, Munich 95, Vilna)
Babylonian Sanhedrin 67a "husband Stara, lover Pandera" (Editions or MSs: Herzog 1, Barco)
Babylonian Shabbat 104b "husband Pappos, mother Stada" (Editions or MSs: Vilna, Munich 95)
Babylonian Sanhedrin 67a "husband Pappos, mother Stada" (Editions or MSs: Vilna, Munich 95)
Babylonian Shabbat 104b "his mother Miriam who let grow (her) women's hair" (Editions or MSs:  Vilna, Oxford 23, Soncino)
Babylonian Sanhedrin 67a "his mother Miriam who let grow (her) women's hair" (Editions or MSs:  Karlsruhe 2, Munich 95)
 
The full passage is as follows:

Mary as the mother
There is no Talmudic text that directly associates Jesus with Mary (Miriam), instead the association is indirect:  Jesus is associated with a father ("son of Pandera"), and in other passages, Pandera is associated with Mary (as her lover).

Christians
Typically both Jerusalem and Babylonian Talmuds use the generic minim for heretics. Aside from mentions of the five disciples of "Yeshu ha Notzri," the plural Notzrim, "Christians," are only clearly mentioned once in the Babylonian Talmud, (where it is amended to Netzarim, people of the watch) in B.Ta'anit 27b with a late parallel in Masekhet Soferim 17:4. And then "The day of the Notzri according to Rabbi Ishmael is forbidden for ever" in some texts of B.Avodah Zarah 6a.

Relation to the Toledot Yeshu
The Toledot Yeshu (History of Jesus) is a Jewish anti-Christian polemic that purports to be a biography of Jesus.  The work is an early account of Jesus, based on contemporary Jewish views, in which Jesus is described as being the son of Joseph, the son of Pandera  (see a translation of the Yemenite text: Episode of Jesus, or what is also known as Toledot Yeshu). Some scholars conclude that the work is merely an expansion and elaboration on anti-Christian themes in the Talmud. Stephen Gero suggests that an early version of the Toledot Yeshu narrative preceded the Talmud, and that the Talmud drew upon the Toledot Yeshu, but Rubenstein and Schäfer discount that possibility, because they date the origin of the Toledot Yeshu in the early Middle Ages or Late Antiquity.

Related narrative from Celsus
The Platonistic philosopher Celsus, writing circa 150 to 200 CE, wrote a narrative describing a Jew who discounts the story of the Virgin Birth of Jesus.  Scholars have remarked on the parallels (adultery, father's name "Panthera", return from Egypt, magical powers) between Celsus' account and the Talmudic narratives.  In Celsus' account, the Jew says:

"... [Jesus] came from a Jewish village and from a poor country woman who earned her living by spinning. He says that she was driven out by her husband, who was a carpenter by trade, as she was convicted of adultery. Then he says that after she had been driven out by her husband and while she was wandering about in a disgraceful way she secretly gave birth to Jesus. He states that because he [Jesus] was poor he hired himself out as a workman in Egypt, and there tried his hand at certain magical powers on which the Egyptians pride themselves; he returned full of conceit, because of these powers, and on account of them gave himself the title of God ... the mother of Jesus is described as having been turned out by the carpenter who was betrothed to her, as she had been convicted of adultery and had a child by a certain soldier named Panthera."Bernhard Pick, The Talmud: What It Is and What It Knows of Jesus and His Followers, 1887 (reprint Kessinger Publishing, LLC, 2007. p 117–120)

See also
Benjamin Urrutia
Criticism of the Talmud
Gamaliel
Historicity of Jesus
Judaism and Christianity
Judaism's view of Jesus
Life of Jesus in the New Testament
Rejection of Jesus
The Talmud Unmasked
Toledot Yeshu
Yeshu
Yeshua (name)
Birkat haMinim

References

Bibliography

Boyarin, Daniel: Dying for God, Stanford University Press, 1999
Carroll, James, Constantine's sword: the church and the Jews : a history, Houghton Mifflin Harcourt, 2002
Cohn-Sherbok, Dan, Judaism and other faiths, Palgrave Macmillan, 1994
Dalman, Gustav: Jesus Christ in the Talmud, Midrash, Zohar, and the Liturgy of the Synagogue, Deighton, Bell, and Co., 1893
Eisenmenger, Johann Andreas. Entdecktes Judenthum,  1711. English translations:  1732–34 by J.P. Stekelin "The Traditions of the Jews, with the Expositions and Doctrines of the Rabbins,"; English translation re-published in 2006 as "The traditions of the Jews",   by Independent History & Research.  German edition online here .
Goldstein, Morris, Jesus in the Jewish Tradition, Macmillan, 1950
Herford, R. Travers, Christianity in Talmud and Midrash, London: Williams & Norgate, 1903 (reprint New York, KTAV, 1975)
Hirshman, Mark, A Rivalry of Genius: Jewish and Christian Biblical Interpretation in Late Antiquity trans. Baya Stein. Albany: SUNY Press 1996
Klausner, Joseph, Yeshu ha-Notzri (Hebrew), Shtible,  1922.  Translated and reprinted as Jesus of Nazareth, Beacon Books, 1964; translated and reprinted as Jesus of Nazareth, Bloch, 1989
Krauss, Samuel, Das Leben Jesu nach judischen Quellen, Berlin: S. Calvary, 1902
Laible, Heinrich, Jesus Christus im Thalmud (Jesus Christ in the Talmud), 1893. English translation published 2010 by General Books
Daniel J. Lasker, 2007, Ben-Gurion University of the Negev, Israel ""Introduction to 2006 Reprint Edition", of Christianity in Talmud and Midrash, by R. Travers Herford, KTAV Publishing House, Inc., 2007
Lauterbach, Jacob Z., "Jesus in the Talmud” in Rabbinic Essays, Cincinnati: Hebrew Union College Press, 1951 (reprinted by Ktav, 1973).
Johann Maier, Jesus von Nazareth in der talmudischen Uberlieferung, Buchgesellschaft, 1978.
Murcia Thierry, Jésus dans le Talmud et la littérature rabbinique ancienne, Turnhout, 2014; «Témoignages juifs et païens sur Jésus et sur le premier christianisme: la tradition rabbinique», dans Premiers Écrits chrétiens, Gallimard, Bibliothèque de la Pléiade, Paris, 2016.
Neusner, Jacob, Judaism in the Matrix of Christianity Philadelphia: Fortress Press 1986
Pick, Bernhard, The Talmud: what it is and what it says about Jesus and the Christians, 1887 (reprinted Kessinger Publishing, 2007)
 Rubenstein, Jeffrey, Stories of the Babylonian Talmud (cited as "Rubenstein SBT"), JHU Press, 2010
 Rubenstein, Jeffrey, Rabbinic Stories (cited as "Rubenstein"), New York: The Paulist Press, 2002
Schäfer, Peter, Jesus in the Talmud, Princeton University Press, 2007
Seidman, Naomi, Faithful Renderings: Jewish-Christian Difference and the Politics of Translation, University of Chicago Press, 2006
Strack, Hermann: Jesus, die Haretiker und die Christen nach den altesten judischen Angaben, Leipzig: J. C. Hinrichs'sche Buchhandlung, 1910
Theissen, Gerd, Annette Merz, The Historical Jesus: A Comprehensive Guide, Fortress Press, 1998
Van Voorst, Robert E.: Jesus outside the New Testament, Wm. B. Eerdmans Publishing, 2000

External links 

 Search for "Jesus" in the Talmud at Sefaria.org

Jesus in Judaism
Criticism of Christianity
Early Christianity and Judaism
Christianity and Judaism related controversies
Obscenity controversies in literature
Talmud people
Cultural depictions of Mary, mother of Jesus
Virgin birth of Jesus